Hansung Science High School (한성과학고등학교, or simply 한성과학고 or 한성과고) is a high school (ages 15–18) in Seoul, South Korea. It was opened in 1992 and selects its students from the top 3% of middle school graduates. Currently it holds 356 students (253 boys and 103 girls) with 56 teachers. It is located near Dongnimmun station which is served by Seoul Subway Line 3 (Orange Line). The school is for gifted students with talents in mathematics and sciences.

The graduates of the school usually go to engineering schools in Seoul National University, KAIST, Postech, and other prestigious universities in Korea and the world

See also
 Gyeonggi Science High School
 Seoul Science High School
 Sejong Science High School

References

External links
 Official site 

Science high schools in South Korea
High schools in South Korea
Education in Seoul
Educational institutions established in 1992
1992 establishments in South Korea